is a passenger railway station  located in the city of Sakaiminato, Tottori Prefecture, Japan. It is operated by the West Japan Railway Company (JR West).

Lines

Station layout
The station is unattended.

Adjacent stations

History
Amariko Station opened on December 22, 1932.

Passenger statistics
In fiscal 2018, the station was used by an average of 658 passengers daily.

Surrounding area
Tottori Prefectural Sakaiminato Technical High School
Sakaiminato Second Junior High School
Sakaiminato Municipal Yoko Elementary School
Sakaiminato Municipal Seido Elementary School

See also
List of railway stations in Japan

References

External links 

 0641708  Amariko Station from JR-Odekake.net 

Railway stations in Japan opened in 1932
Railway stations in Tottori Prefecture
Stations of West Japan Railway Company
Sakaiminato, Tottori